The Ministry of Planning, formerly Ministry of Public Works, Transport and Communications ( or MOPTC) was a Portuguese government ministry. It had its head office in Lisbon.

The Gabinete de Prevenção e Investigação de Acidentes com Aeronaves was a subordinate agency.

References

External links

Portugal
Portugal
Planning and Infrastructure